Myelois cribratella is a species of snout moth. It is found in Romania and on Sicily, Sardinia and Corsica.

References

Moths described in 1847
Phycitini
Moths of Europe
Moths of Asia